Unione Sportiva Pistoiese 1921 is an Italian association football club, based in Pistoia, Tuscany. Currently, Pistoiese plays in Serie D. Originally founded on 21 April 1921 and later restored after bankruptcy, the team plays their home games in the Municipal Stadium of Pistoia named after Marcello Melani.

The singer-songwriter Francesco Guccini is probably the most famous tifoso of Pistoiese in Italy.

History
Since its inception la societá arancione (Orange Society) founded on April 21, 1921, has been characterized by its European inclinations, being the city historically a crossroads of historical-religious paths to and from the geographical areas of the Old Continent.

It is no coincidence that among the protagonists of the birth of l’Arancione you will find the Hungarians Árpád Hajós and János Nehadoma, with the jersey inspired by that of Holland, which, like the city of Pistoia, boasts a strong floriculture.

In 1927 Pistoiese won their first major honours winning the Arpinati Cup.  After winning minor regional championships they were elected to play in the National Division in 1928.

Between 1929 and 1936 they participated in the campionato cadetto finishing first on a couple of occasions. US Pistoiese played their last championship in 1939–40.

Pistoiese Sports Union

Competitive football resumed in 1945 when a group of fans re-founded the team as Pistoiese Sports Union and was admitted to the Serie C.  The following were to be characterized by a series of ups and downs between Serie C, Serie D, and the Promozione Championship, with a brief period in Serie B immediately after the Second World War, in which a third-place position was reached.

From 1946 to 1956–57, the team started that fluctuation between the leagues until Vannino Vannucci rose to the presidency in 1956–57 and Pistoiese became a Jewel in the Nile at a cost of 100 million lire.

In the 1958–59 championship, Pistoiese went 21 consecutive games without defeat, in this time amassing 36 points from a possible 42 (2 points for a win) and scoring 45 goals.  Most memorable is the match against Empoli, a local rival and competitor for the promotion. The Arancione won 6–0.  The final standing that season read 77 goals scored and 24 conceded. After 8 years, they had again reached Serie C.

In the 1960s, the team participated for ten consecutive seasons in Serie C.

U.S. Pistoiese
Pistoiese achieved prominence by rising to Serie B in the late 1970s with promotion to Serie A following in 1980. Under the presidency of Marcello Melani, who chose veterans like Marcello Lippi and Mario Frustalupi and promising young talents such as Paolo Benedetti, Pistoiese reached Serie A in just 6 years and made a reasonable start, reaching as high as 6th after a win at Fiorentina in Round 13. But a dismal freefall resulted in a last-place finish and relegation. Since 1980, the club has only managed two stretches in Serie B (1995–96 and 1999–2002). Melani left his post in 1980, followed by Lippi in 1981.

A.C. Nuova Pistoiese 1988

In the 2005–06 Serie C1/B campaign, Pistoiese battled against relegation from Serie C1 with goals proving hard to come by, yet having one of the best defensive records in the division. A good end to the season brought the team to a 9th-place finish in Group A, which was three points ahead of the relegation playoff. Pistoiese finished 14th in Group B in the 2007–08 season and competed in a relegation play-off against Sangiovannese. They won by 4–0 aggregate and remained in Lega Pro Prima Divisione (former Serie C1).

The Tuscan club started the 2008–09 season with Roberto Miggiano as head coach, but disappointing results and a last-place position in the Lega Pro Prima Divisione table led the club to replace him with Salvatore Polverino later in October. However, results did not improve under new boss Polverino, prompting him to tender his resignation in February 2009. He was replaced by former Juventus star Moreno Torricelli, in his first stint as a professional head coach; under Torricelli's reign, Pistoiese managed to improve results and escape immediate relegation ending in 16th place. Nevertheless, Pistoiese lost a play-off against Foligno and was relegated to Lega Pro Seconda Divisione.

In the summer of 2009, Pistoiese was not permitted enrollment in Lega Pro Seconda Divisione due to inadequate finances.

Unione Sportiva Pistoiese 1921
On 13 August 2009 Unione Sportiva Pistoiese 1921 was created by Pistoia's mayor, Berti. The club was admitted to Tuscany's Eccellenza league and managed an excellent inaugural year, reaching the play-off for promotion, where it eventually lost to Mosciano.

In the 2010–11 season, it won Eccellenza Tuscany group A and was thus promoted to Serie D. Pistoiese managed to reacquire professional status after winning the Girone E of 2013–14 Serie D, thus ensuring a spot in the 2014–15 Lega Pro.

In January 2021, the club was acquired by German entrepreneur Stefan Lehmann, the first foreign owner in Pistoiese history.

Colors and badge
The team's colors are orange and blue.

Current squad

Former players
 Massimiliano Allegri
 Francesco Baiano
 Mauro Bellugi
 Sergio Brio
 Mario Frustalupi
 Francesco Guidolin
 Adrian Madaschi
 Nicola Legrottaglie
 Marcello Lippi
 Lido Vieri
 Andrea Barzagli
 Souleymane Coulibaly
 Neuton

Former managers
 Edmondo Fabbri
 Marcello Lippi

References

External links
Official site

 
Football clubs in Tuscany
Pistoia
Association football clubs established in 1921
Italian football First Division clubs
Serie A clubs
Serie B clubs
Serie C clubs
Serie D clubs
Sport in Tuscany
1921 establishments in Italy
Phoenix clubs (association football)
1988 establishments in Italy
2009 establishments in Italy